The Corporación Radio e Televisión de Galicia (CRTVG) is the public broadcaster for the autonomous community of Galicia, Spain.

Organisation
CRTVG was created on 11 July 1984 with the Lei de Galicia 9/1984. With this law two separate companies were created; Televisión de Galicia, S.A. which is responsible for producing televisual output and Radio Galega, S.A. which produces its radio content.

 Televisión de Galicia, S.A. 
 TVG
 tvG2
 TVG Europa 
 TVG América
 Radio Galega, S.A.
 Radio Galega
 Radio Galega Música
 Son Galicia Radio

Governance
The network is governed by a tripartisan board of directors appointed by the Galician Parliament.

board of directors
 María Bastida Domínguez (People's Party of Galicia, PPdeG)
 Xosé Luís Iravedra Lestal (PPdeG)
 Xoán Manuel Jiménez Morán (PPdeG)
 Arturo Maneiro Vila (PPdeG)
 Higinio Meijide Gómez (PPdeG)
 Ana Isabel Peón Pineiro (PPdeG)
 Juan Carlos Araújo Rodríguez (Socialists' Party of Galicia, PSdeG-PSOE)
 Roberto Cid González (PSdeG-PSOE)
 Adriana Fernández Vázquez (PSdeG-PSOE)
 Carlos Alberto Rodríguez Calvo (PSdeG-PSOE)
 Manuel Antelo Pazos (Galician Nationalist Bloc, BNG)
 Montserrat Prado Cores (BNG)

Director General
The director general is the head of CRTVG. He is directly appointed by the Xunta de Galicia. The current director general of CRTVG is Alfonso Sánchez Izquierdo.

 1985–86 Luis Losada
 1986–87 Lois Caeiro
 1987–90 Abilio Bernardo de Quirós
 1990–94 Ramón Villot
 1994-05 Francisco Campos
 2005–09 Benigno Sánchez
 2009– Alfonso Sánchez Izquierdo

See also
 FORTA

References

External links
 Official website 

 
Mass media in Galicia (Spain)
FORTA
Spanish radio networks
Television networks in Spain
Television stations in Galicia (Spain)
Companies based in Galicia (Spain)
Publicly funded broadcasters
State media
Television channels and stations established in 1984
Mass media companies established in 1984
1984 establishments in Spain